The Living Dead is the second studio album by Bump of Chicken, first released on March 25, 2000, on High Line Records. It was released again on April 28, 2004, on Toy's Factory.

Track listing
All tracks written by Fujiwara Motoo, except where noted.
"Opening" — 1:03
 — 3:56
 (Fujiwara, Naoi Yoshifumi) — 4:41
 — 5:13
"Lamp" — 4:32
"K" — 3:51
 — 5:35
"Ever Lasting Lie" — 8:37
 — 3:13
"Ending" — 1:14
"The Living Dead" (hidden track)

Personnel
Fujiwara Motoo — Guitar, vocals
Masukawa Hiroaki — Guitar
Naoi Yoshifumi — Bass
Masu Hideo — Drums

External links
The Living Dead at the official Bump of Chicken website.

2000 albums
Bump of Chicken albums
Japanese-language albums